The Netze District or District of the Netze ( or) was a territory in the Kingdom of Prussia from 1772 until 1807. It included the urban centers of Bydgoszcz (Bromberg), Inowrocław (Inowraclaw), Piła (Schneidemühl) and Wałcz (Deutsch Krone) and was given its name for the Noteć River that traversed it.

Beside Royal Prussia, a land of the Polish Crown since 1466, King Frederick II of Prussia also seized the adjacent lands of the Prowincja of Greater Poland to the south from the Polish–Lithuanian Commonwealth in the First Partition of Poland of 1772. At first Royal Prussia, i.e. the former Pomeranian, Malbork and Chełmno voivodeships, but with the exception of the former Prince-Bishopric of Warmia, was organized as the province of West Prussia. On the other hand, the adjacent annexed areas of the Greater Polish Poznań and Gniezno Voivodeships, as well as of the Kuyavian lands of western Inowrocław Voivodeship along the Noteć (Netze) formed the separate Netze District under governor Franz Balthasar Schönberg von Brenkenhoff.

Von Brenkenhoff however soon was accused of the waste of public funds in the course of the construction of the Bydgoszcz Canal, and from 1775 on the Netze District was administrated with West Prussia. With the 1793 Second Partition of Poland, the remainder of the Greater Polish province was annexed by Prussia and formed the new province of South Prussia. After the Prussian defeat in the War of the Fourth Coalition and the Greater Poland Uprising, large parts of the southern Netze District according to the 1807 Treaties of Tilsit fell to the Bydgoszcz Department of the Duchy of Warsaw. The remaining northwestern territory around Wałcz and Kamień was incorporated into the West Prussian province.

At the Congress of Vienna in 1815, the demarcation line was confirmed as the northern border of the newly established Grand Duchy of Posen. The southern territories of the former Netze District were administered within the Bromberg Region (Polish: Rejencja), while the northwestern part belonged to the West Prussian of Marienwerder Region (Kwidzyn).

See also 
Polish Partitions
West Prussia
South Prussia

External links
Map of Poznań area in 1789 showing Netze District
Map of Central Europe in 1786 showing Netze District

Subdivisions of Prussia
Former administrative regions of Greater Poland
Geographic history of Poland
States and territories established in 1772
1772 establishments in Prussia